Agrotis photophila, the light-loving noctuid moth, is a species of moth in the family Noctuidae. It is endemic to Oahu, Hawaii, United States.

This moth was last reported around 1900. Two dead specimens are preserved in the British Museum. These had been collected near Honolulu in the 19th century. At that time the species was already rare.

These dead specimens have been described thus:
35—40 mm. Fore- 
wings light greyish-ochreous sprinkled with fuscous ; subbasal, first, and second lines 
indicated by more or less distinct blackish dots, first and second sometimes forming 
undefined waved lines ; posterior edge of reniform sometimes indicated by black 
scales ; traces of a darker praesubterminal shade ; a terminal series of dark fuscous 
dots. Hindwings light greyish-ochreous, posteriorly infuscated.

References

Hawaii extinct species

Agrotis
Endemic moths of Hawaii
Moths described in 1879
Taxonomy articles created by Polbot